Redfern railway station is a heritage-listed former railway bridge and now railway station located on the Main Suburban railway line in the Inner City Sydney suburb of Redfern in the City of Sydney local government area of New South Wales, Australia. It was designed by John Whitton and built by Department of Railways. It is also known as Redfern Railway Station group and Tenterfield railway. The property was added to the New South Wales State Heritage Register on 2 April 1999.

The station that opened on 26 September 1855 is located on what was originally the Illawarra line. It is now served by all Sydney Trains lines except the Cumberland Line and the airport branch of the Airport & South Line. Some NSW TrainLink Intercity services also call at the station.

History

History of Redfern suburb
Redfern's natural landscape was defined by sand hills and swamps. The Carrahdigang, more widely known as the Cadigal people, valued the area for its abundant supply of food.

The name Redfern originates from an early land grant to William Redfern in 1817. It was previously known as Roberts Farm and Boxley's Swamp. William Redfern (1774?-1833) was a surgeon's mate in the Royal Navy and was aboard HMS Standard when its crew took part in the revolt in 1797 known as the Mutiny of the Nore. Because he had advised the men to be more united, he was included among leaders who were court-martialled. Although sentenced to death, he was reprieved because of his youth and in 1801 arrived in Sydney as a convict. He served on Norfolk Island as an assistant surgeon. In 1803 he was pardoned, but remained on the island until 1808, when he returned to Sydney and was appointed assistant surgeon after being examined in medicine and surgery by Surgeons Jamison, Harris and Bohan.

In 1816 he took charge of the new Sydney Hospital, but maintained a private practice. In 1814 he reported on conditions on convict transport ships and his recommendation that all have a surgeon on board whose duties were to superintend the health of convicts was put into practice. He resigned from Government service in 1819 when not appointed to succeed D'Arcy Wentworth as principal surgeon. Despite his valuable service, many were contemptuous of him as he was an emancipist, although he had the friendship of Governor Macquarie.

In 1817 he had been granted  in the area of the present suburb of Redfern. The boundaries were approximately the present-day Cleveland, Regent, Redfern and Elizabeth Streets. The commodious home Redfern built on his land was considered to be a country house, surrounded by flower and kitchen gardens. His neighbours were John Baptist (at the  Darling Nursery in today's Chippendale) and Captain Cleveland, an officer of the 73rd regiment, remembered by today's street of that name, and before its demolition, by Cleveland House, his home.

The passing of the Sydney Slaughterhouses Act in 1849 brought other businesses to the district. This act banned abattoirs and noxious trades from the city. Tanners, wool scourers and wool-washers, fellmongers, boiling down works and abattoirs had ten years to move their businesses outside city boundaries. Many of the trades moved to Redfern and Waterloo - attracted by the water. The sand hills still existed but by the late 1850s Redfern was a flourishing suburb housing 6,500 people.

The Municipalities Act of 1858 gave districts the option of municipal incorporation. Public meetings were held and after a flurry of petitions Redfern Municipality was proclaimed on 11 August 1859, the fourth in Sydney to be formed under the Act. Redfern Town Hall opened in 1870 and the Albert Cricket Ground in 1864. Redfern Post Office came in 1882. The majority of houses in Redfern in the 1850s were of timber. From the 1850s market gardeners congregated in Alexandria south of McEvoy Street, around Shea's Creek and Bourke Road.

When Sydney's original railway terminus was built in the Cleveland Paddocks, which extended from Devonshire and Cleveland Streets to Chippendale, the station's name was chosen to honour William Redfern. The station was built of iron and the first stationmaster was a Mr Fielding. In 1874 the station was replaced by a brick and stone structure, covering two platforms. At that time the present Redfern station was known as Eveleigh, after a lovely old home standing on the western side of the railway line.

When Central railway station was built, on the site of the Devonshire Street cemetery, the name of Eveleigh Station was changed to Redfern. The name Eveleigh was retained for the huge railway workshops, just beyond the station, on the site of the original Hutchinson Estate.

All that remains of the Cleveland Paddocks is Prince Alfred Park, where the exhibition building was erected in 1870 for an inter-colonial exhibition opened by Governor Belmore, after whom Belmore Park was named, on 30 August 1870.

Redfern was the scene of the maiden trip of the first double-decker tram in 1879. It travelled between the old Redfern station to the corner of Hunter and Elizabeth Streets in the city. In 1885 the Sands Sydney Directory listed 54 market gardens. While many were worked by European-Australians, by the 1870s Chinese market gardeners had acquired leases in the district and a decade later were dominating the trade.

The Eveleigh complex in 1886 became one of the largest employers in the state. Redfern was an industrial working class suburb by the end of the 19th century. Reschs brewery and other factories attracted migrants. The Syrian/Lebanese community began settling around Redfern and Surry Hills by the 1880s.

Redfern railway station

In the early history of the New South Wales Government Railways, Redfern station was the frequently used but unofficial name of the principal Sydney terminus, a fact which has led to persistent confusion. That station, the first Sydney Terminal, was north of Cleveland Street, which is Redfern's northern boundary, and south of Devonshire Street. It opened on 26 September 1855 in an area known as Cleveland Fields which is now the railway corridor called Sydney Yard. This original 'Redfern' station comprised one wooden platform in a corrugated iron shed. As traffic increased the original station was replaced in 1874 by a brick building containing two platforms. This second station, the second Sydney Terminal which grew to 14 platforms, was designed for through traffic if the lines were extended in the city direction. This second station was found to be too far from the city centre, so a new station (the present Sydney Central station) was built to the north of Devonshire Street and opened on 4 August 1906. The 1874 station was soon demolished.

In 1885 Eveleigh's platforms were reconstructed at the present Redfern site, and on 21 October 1906 this station was renamed Redfern. At the time it was named Eveleigh Station, as the main terminus for the Sydney line was then called Redfern and was located approximately halfway between the present Redfern Station and Central. The Eveleigh Station was opened to serve the new Eveleigh railway workshops, the first stage of which was completed in 1887, as well as the inner-city residential and industrial suburb of Redfern, one of Sydney's most high-density residential areas. By the 1940s, three-quarters of Sydney factory workers worked within a three-mile radius of Redfern Station, and many commuted to work by train.

The original station consisted of three island platforms serving four lines. The ticket office was located on the corner of Lawson Street and Rosehill Street, with stairs down to each individual platform. Rosehill Street was demolished to make way for the later expansion of Redfern Station to the east, while the ticket office survived and was later extended.

The construction of the Redfern station was overseen by the office of John Whitton, engineer-in-chief of the NSW Railways. Whitton had been appointed in 1856 at the beginning of the NSW railway development and remained in the position until 1890, overseeing the establishment of the main body of the NSW system. The station was extended in 1891/92 to accommodate the quadruplication of the main suburban lines, with new platforms being built during this period (Platforms 5, 6 and 7) and again in 1919 (Platforms 8 and 9) and again in 1924/25 (Platform 10). In 1913 a footbridge was erected at the southern end of the platforms to allow access to the Eveleigh workshops from the station for the workers. The footbridge extended across all the platforms with stairs down to each.

On 1 August 1926, a further two platforms opened on the southern side (9 and 10) as part of the electrification of the Illawarra line. Work on underground platforms 11 and 12 began in the 1940s but did not finish until the 1970s when the Eastern Suburbs railway line was opened in 1979. The original plans of The City and Suburban Electric Railways (Amendment) Act of 1947 had included additional railway lines that were never completed, resulting in unfinished platforms and tunnels existing above the current platforms 11 and 12.

Until 1994, Redfern had an overhead footbridge at the Eveleigh end of the platforms, connecting platforms 1-10 by stairs. This was demolished because the funds for its maintenance were not available. In  the southern footbridge was removed as the Eveleigh railway workshops were gradually closed down and the footbridge was no longer required.

In  the station underwent a major upgrade including the demolition of the northern footbridge and stairs to the platforms. A new footbridge and stairs were built, with only a pair of iron newel posts on platform 1 remaining of the earlier stairways. A single track tunnel was built for steam locomotives from Central station to access Eveleigh Railway Workshops. Known as the Engine Dive, it dives to the north of Platform 1 surfacing at the southern end of Platform 10. A number of chimneys still exist, especially on Platform 1.

The present Redfern station was damaged by fire in the 2004 Redfern riots. The ticketing area and station master's office were significantly damaged - and the windows in the front of the station were bricked up for almost a year afterwards to prevent further attacks. They have since been replaced with glass windows.

A rising public concern about the lack of disability access to the station platforms led to a petition of over 50,000 signatures and a debate in State Parliament in 2013. Transport Minister Gladys Berejiklian has committed funding to provide a lift to one platform. A lift eventually opened on platform 6 & 7 in November 2015.

The Gibbons Street exit closed in 2018 and was replaced by a new entrance on the corner of Gibbons & Lawson Streets in November 2018.

In August 2019 further improved accessibility was proposed including a new concourse at the southern end of the station. The Southern Concourse began construction in 2021 and will include elevator access to Platforms 1-10 and a new entrance off Little Eveleigh St along with the existing Marian St entrance.

Elevator access to Platforms 11-12 will be a separate project involving a multi-story private development, noting the tracks diverge.

Station configuration
Redfern has 12 platforms, ten above ground (linked by stairs to the concourse at Lawson Street), and two underground (linked by stairs and escalators to the concourse at Gibbons Street). The two concourses are linked. Station offices and facilities such as toilets and the main indicator boards are located next to the Lawson Street entry.

As part of the construction of the Eastern Suburbs Railway (now platforms 11 and 12), it was proposed to build up to four platforms for the underground route. Two of these platforms were built and now are platforms 11 and 12, however, the two platforms above were half constructed above platforms 11 and 12. These are visible through a small gap in the wall opposite Platform 11, as well as by a boarded up entry portal under the Lawson Street Bridge (which was to be the down track), and a now filled-in dive tunnel under the Wells Street Sectioning Hut on the Central side of Lawson Street. The area in which the platforms were to be situated is visible from the station concourse at the entrance to Platform 10.

Platforms and services

Description 

The Redfern railway station complex includes a type 19 Overhead Booking Office, erected in 1892; a type 3 waiting room located on Platform 1, erected in 1884; a store located on Platform 1, erected ; an office, located on Platform 1, erected ; five type 11 station buildings located on Platforms 1 to 10, erected in 1912; and the Eastern Suburbs Railway (ESR) Platforms 11–12, erected in 1979. Other structures in the heritage-listed complex include platforms, completed in 1884 and 1912; the Lawson Street Overbridge, completed in 1891; Air vents to engine dive, located on Platform 1; ESR Steel Framework and Tunnels, erected ; and the footbridge, steps and canopies, erected in 1999.

Overhead booking office
Erected in 1892, the exterior of Redfern Station consists of a main entrance building and ticket office, built of brick in a Federation Queen Anne style with terracotta tiled hipped roof with central cupola and ornamental flèche. The central building is accessed from Lawson Street via the original central arched doorway flanked with sandstone columns and pediment or via a larger entrance to the east, which replaced an earlier arched window. Sandstone quoin blocks feature at the corners of the central portion of the entrance building, with sandstone keystones above the windows and doors and sandstone sills. A number of additions to the entrance building are visible along the Lawson Street frontage.

The building interior includes the ticket office, Station Master's office and male and female toilets. The ceiling is of timber tongue-and-groove boards with decorative ceiling roses and exposed timber beams. Electronic ticket gates lead to the overhead walkway that provides access to each of the platforms.

Waiting room
The brick, Type 3, waiting room, completed in 1884, features a U-shaped floor pattern with enclosed end wings. An open waiting area with a timber bench seat spans the space between each wing. The waiting room building also features a corrugated iron hipped roof and chimneys. The enclosed wings each have two double hung sash timber windows with double arched label moulds above and rendered sills with brackets beneath. Each wing also contains a fireplace.

Store
Adjacent to the waiting room is a simple rectangular brick Store Room, completed , with three double hung sash timber windows (two facing the tracks and one facing north) and a door at its southern end. The building has a hipped corrugated iron roof hidden behind a brick parapet. Possibly former toilet.

Offices
The third Platform 1 building is a rectangular brick office building, completed , with six timber sash windows facing the platform and a door at either end. The building has a corrugated iron gabled roof. The construction date of the building is unknown, but appears to be contemporary with other Platform 1 structures.

Platform buildings
Each of the island platforms (2-9) and the wayside Platform 10 all include variations on the Standard (A8-A10) Island Platform design, all with platform offices and some with public toilets, completed in 1912. There are five in total. The buildings are constructed of face brick with rendered architraves, sills and brackets. The buildings feature a gabled corrugated sheet metal roof with a single corbelled and rendered chimney. The roof extends to form a platform awning which spans the length of the structures, and is supported on double curved cast iron brackets upon rendered brackets. The roof extends to form a covered area to the north of each building, which is supported by simple timber posts. The string course is of two small projecting rendered bands, with the rows of brick between painted to give the impression of a deep rendered string. Most original double-hung timber windows remain. Decorative features include timber valance to awning ends and coloured glass to upper panes of windows.

Eastern Suburbs Railway (ESR) platforms
Completed in 1979, Platforms 11 and 12 are underground, being part of the Eastern Suburbs Railway and Illawarra Line. These are accessed via stairs or escalators from the street level. The escalator shaft ceilings are of moulded plywood. This plywood, with recessed fluorescent strip lights, is used throughout the station platform area. Station walls are tiled, with the station name in tri-level banked blue lettering. The platforms consist of an island platform divided with tiled masonry walls. The platform faces are concrete.

Platforms
The station includes 12 platforms (2 underground on ESR) formed in seven island platforms, all facing two lines except Platform 1 and Platform 10 which both face single lines. Platforms 1- 10 are constructed of brick with bitumen surface. Platforms 11 and 12 are concrete.

Lawson Street Overbridge
The northern end of the Station is defined by the Lawson Street Overbridge, completed in 1891, which carries Lawson Street across the tracks. The bridge is brick laid in English bond pattern and was constructed in 1891. The bridge has been altered and extended in various stages. Construction appears to be a combination of jack arch, steel girder and concrete slab.

Air vents to engine dive on Platform 1
Platform 1 includes four brick ventilation air vents or chimneys for the engine dive line that runs underneath the station, allowing engines to traverse between the Sydney Yard and the Eveleigh Maintenance Centre.

ESR steel framework and tunnels
Above Platforms 11 and 12, exposed steelwork for an unfinished platform remains in place, completed . Unfinished tunnels also run north and south from this section of the station, indicating earlier plans for extensions that never proceeded.

Footbridge, steps and canopies
The footbridge and steps to platforms was largely upgraded in 1999, and features a covered area connected to the Overhead Booking Office and glazed viewing area with access to all platforms. Platforms 2-9 also feature modern metal canopies joining access stairs to the platform buildings which forms a covered area for commuters. This was installed in 1999 as part of a new overhead walkway and access stairs to each platform. The stairs are concrete treads with steel banisters and balustrades.

Landscape
The garden on Platform 1 runs along the western wall of the platform from the base of the stairs to the first building on the platform. Some garden plantings remain but it is not maintained to a high standard.

Condition 

As at 10 June 2009, the station building, including the Overhead Booking Office, Station Buildings on Platforms 2-10, and ESR Platforms were all in good condition. The structures at Redfern Station are in good condition with the exception of the disused tunnels at the eastern end and the exposed steelwork frames which are rusted. At least one section of tunnel has been backfilled due to threat of collapse. A condition report completed for the Lawson Street overbridge in 2006 indicated a number of structural issues that required attention.

The platform buildings and overhead booking office in particular retain a high level of integrity.

Modifications and dates 
1925-27: Platform 1 footbridge raised for electrification with two concrete steps at platform level.
1981: demolition of small timber waiting shed on Platform 1
: Station platform upgrading
1994: removal of southern footbridge
: station upgrades including new footbridge at northern end and stair access to platforms
2004: station damaged by fire, ticket office windows bricked up to prevent vandalism.
2018: New eastern entrance and turnstiles opened on the corner of Lawson Street and Gibbon Street
2021: construction commenced of a new southern concourse between Little Eveleigh Street and Marian Street, providing lift access to all above ground platforms.

Since 2013 there have been a number of announcements concerning major upgrades for Redfern Station including the building of a lift to platforms 6 and 7. In December 2014 Transport for NSW invited customers to provide feedback on plans for the new lift at Redfern station. Work on the upgrade commenced on 13 April 2015.
The lift opened on 30 November 2015.

Accessibility and exits
The station has three main exits ― the main entrance and exit on Lawson Street next to the ticketing area (Exit A on the diagram below), a second entrance on Gibbons Street (especially for passengers using platforms 11 and 12) (Exit B on the diagram below), and a third exit to the Australian Technology Park, which is accessed by walking along platform 10 (Exit C on the diagram).

Station map

Legend:

Transport links
Redfern does not have a connecting bus interchange. However, two stops along Gibbon Street close to the Gibbons Street entrance (near platforms 11 & 12) serve the following Transdev John Holland, Transit Systems and two NightRide routes:
305: to Mascot Stamford Hotel
306: to Mascot station
308: Marrickville Metro to Eddy Avenue
309: to Port Botany
N11: Cronulla station to Town Hall station
N20: Riverwood station to Town Hall station

There are stops further afield in Redfern Street servicing bus routes to Railway Square and in Regent Street servicing bus routes to Marrickville, Mascot and Banksmeadow.

Heritage listing 

As at 26 June 2009, Redfern Railway Station Group is significant at a state level as a major suburban station which played an important role in the development of the surrounding residential and industrial suburbs. The overhead booking office is a rare remaining example of the Queen Anne style of railway architecture and along with the 1884 station building on Platform 1 remain as some of the last examples of these types of structures to survive in the metropolitan area. The booking office retains its overall form and much original detail.

The platform buildings on platforms 2-10 are consistent in design and represent the largest group of such buildings in the system at one site, reflecting the location's importance as a junction for commuters and for its access to the adjacent Eveleigh workshops. The addition of platforms and their associated platform buildings, including the Eastern Suburbs Railway, represent the importance of the Station as a commuter hub and reflect the expansion of Redfern Station and the Sydney network generally though the later nineteenth and into the twentieth century. Structures such as the air vents or chimneys connected to the underground engine dive, on Platform 1, are indicators of the adjacent industrial uses of the Eveleigh Yards and are unusual features on a suburban station.

The early station buildings and structures indicate the high quality of buildings provided during the mid-Victorian period of railway construction and the former importance of Redfern as an industrial and residential area in the development of the Sydney suburbs. The pair of newel posts is an example of colonial cast-iron work and represents the end of the era of ornamentation brought about by Railway Commissioner Eddy.

Redfern railway station was listed on the New South Wales State Heritage Register on 2 April 1999 having satisfied the following criteria.

The place is important in demonstrating the course, or pattern, of cultural or natural history in New South Wales.

Redfern Station has historic significance as a major suburban station that served Eveleigh Railway workshops as well as the surrounding industrial suburbs of Redfern, Darlington and Chippendale and as such served to promote the growth of these suburbs. The station retains a collection of early station buildings, including a prominent overhead booking office as its main entrance which is a rare example of its type, demonstrating the changing use and expansion of the station. Redfern Station is also associated with the development of the Eveleigh railway workshops for which it served as the main station for workers. The expansion of the Sydney network is evident at Redfern through the addition of platforms to cope with new lines, including the Eastern Suburbs Railway in the 1970s.

The place has a strong or special association with a person, or group of persons, of importance of cultural or natural history of New South Wales's history.

Redfern Railway Station is associated with engineer-in-chief of the NSW Railways, John Whitton who oversaw the development of the station towards the end of his long employment in the role.

The place is important in demonstrating aesthetic characteristics and/or a high degree of creative or technical achievement in New South Wales.

Redfern Station has aesthetic significance with a collection of nineteenth and early twentieth century railway buildings built to set designs for the NSW railways and providing a consistency of style across the network. The overhead booking office on Lawson Street is a fine example of the Queen Anne style for railway architecture and is one of the few remaining examples of this type on the Sydney system. The remaining portion of the Station garden has some local aesthetic significance and demonstrates the former practice of maintaining a station garden at suburban stations.

The place has a strong or special association with a particular community or cultural group in New South Wales for social, cultural or spiritual reasons.

The place has the potential to contribute to the local community's sense of place and can provide a connection to the local community's history.

The place possesses uncommon, rare or endangered aspects of the cultural or natural history of New South Wales.

Redfern Station ticket and booking office is a rare surviving example of a Queen Anne style overhead booking office, being one of only three remaining examples on the Sydney network, Newtown and Homebush being the others. The elaborate detailing of the building, including the cupola and decorative fleche, make it unique in Sydney's railway architecture. The cast iron newell posts, remaining on Platform 1 are rare surviving examples of decorative iron work (once part of a larger iron latticework stairway) that was briefly introduced to suburban stations but discontinued by Commissioner Eddy after Redfern Station was built. The brick air vents or chimneys on Platform 1 are unusual features on a suburban station and demonstrate the connection to the Eveleigh Railyards adjacent to Redfern.

The place is important in demonstrating the principal characteristics of a class of cultural or natural places/environments in New South Wales.

Redfern Station is representative of late nineteenth-century suburban railway development with a range of standard railway designed building styles and uses for the period 1890–1925. They remain the largest group of such buildings in the NSW system. It is representative of the expansion of the railway network to accommodate increasing passengers and new lines, as illustrated by the development of the Eastern Suburbs Railway. The station continues to serve as a major commuter station on the Sydney network.

See also 

List of railway stations in Sydney

References

Bibliography

Attribution

External links

 Redfern station at Transport for New South Wales (Archived 1 May 2020)
Redfern Station Public Transport Map Transport for NSW
 Gallery of unfinished platforms 13 & 14

John Whitton railway stations
Railway stations located underground in Sydney
Railway stations in Australia opened in 1855
Railway stations in Australia opened in 1906
Redfern, New South Wales
New South Wales State Heritage Register
Railway bridges in New South Wales
Articles incorporating text from the New South Wales State Heritage Register
Illawarra railway line
Bankstown railway line
Queen Anne architecture in Australia